Han Soosan (born 1946)  is a South Korean writer.

Early years
Born on November 13, 1946 in Inje, Gangwan-do, Han Soosan graduated from Chuncheon High School and initially went to college at the Chuncheon College of Education in 1965, from which he transferred to Kyunghee University, where he graduated with a degree in Korean Literature.  A key moment in Han's life was in 1981 when he contributed to a serialized novel that satirized then Korean president Chun Doo-hwan. Han, as well as other newspaper workers, was rounded up and tortured by the government. In 1998, he moved to Japan for four years, where he wrote several stories about Korean residents of Japan. Han teaches Korean Literature at Sejong University.

Work
Han Soosan is known in Korea for his delicate and expressive writing style. Han made his debut as a poet and began publishing works of fiction in the early 1970s. In 1972 his short story "The End of April" won the Dong-a Daily literary contest. He also won the Korea Daily prize in 1973 for his novel "A Morning in the Season of Reconciliation," and in 1977 won the "Today's Writer Prize" for his work "Floating Weeds." In 1984 he won the Nogwon Literature Prize and in 1991 the Contemporary Literature Prize.
Han calls his novel Raven his "life's work." It is a multi-volume epic following the lives of Korean men conscripted by the Japanese during the colonial era. It has not been translated into English.

Works in Translation
 Floating Grass (Dong-suh-Mu Seoul, 1990; translated by Kim Seong-Kon)
 Ende einer Vorstellung (Pendragon, 1999)
 لعشب العائم (부초) (카이로대학 출판부, 2006)
 軍艦島 (까마귀) (作品社, 2009)

Works in Korean (Partial)
 The Morning of the Thawing Season (Haebing-gi-ui Achim, 1973)
 Floating Grass (Bucho, 1977)
 The End of April (Sawol-ui Kkeut 1978)
 The Street of Desire (Yonmang-ui Geori, 1981)
 A Street Musician (Geori-ui Aksa, 1986)
 The Wooden Horse that Went to Sea (Bada-ro Gan Mokma, 1989)
 A Horserider Passeth (Maltan Ja-neun Jingada, 1998)

Awards
 Nogwon Literature Prize (1984)
 Contemporary Literature (Hyundae Munhak) Award  (1991)

References 

1946 births
South Korean novelists
20th-century South Korean poets
Kyung Hee University alumni
Living people
South Korean male poets
20th-century male writers